Karas is a surname with multiple origins. In Slavic languages, it refers to crucian carp and related cyprinids. Notable people with the surname include:

 Anton Karas (1906–1985), Austrian zither player and composer
 Archie Karas (born 1950), Greek gambler
 Beth Karas (born 1957), American attorney and TV commentator
 Jan Karaś (born 1959), Polish footballer
 Jay Karas, American film and television director and producer
 Joe Karas, American politician
 Josef Karas (born 1978), Czech decathlete
 Joža Karas (1926–2008), Polish-born Czech-American musician
 Kamil Karaš (born 1991), Slovak footballer
 Kenneth M. Karas (born 1964), American judge
 Marios Karas (born 1974), Cypriot football defender
 Michael Karas (born 1952), German physical chemist
 Mieczysław Karaś (1924–1977), Polish linguist
 Monika Karas (born 1960s), Hungarian journalist
 Othmar Karas (born 1957), Austrian politician
 Tomáš Karas (born 1975), Czech rower
 Vjekoslav Karas (1821–1858), Croatian painter
 Vladimír Karas (1927–2003), Czech gymnast
 Witold Karaś (born 1951), Polish footballer
 Władysław Karaś (1893–1942), Polish sport shooter

See also
 
 Karasyov
 Caris (name), given name and surname

Czech-language surnames
Greek-language surnames
Polish-language surnames
Surnames